West Way may refer to the following:

 West Way, Oxfordshire, a road in Oxfordshire, England
 West Way, New York, a road in New York, USA
 West Way (Black Forest), a 285-km-long trail in the Black Forest in Germany and Switzerland

See also
Westway (disambiguation)